The 2013 Safari Sevens are the 18th annual edition of the Safari Sevens.

Tournament administration

Venue

Dates

Ticketing

Match officials

The 2013 tournament match officials

Men's tournament

Participating Teams

Pool A

Pool B

Pool C

Pool D

Teams unable to attend
Teams slated to attend but later withdrew included:

Pool stages
Results form the pool stages.

Pool A

|}

Pool B

|}

Pool C

|}

Pool D

|}

Knockout stage
Results from the knockout stage.

Cup

Plate

Bowl

Shield

Women's Tournament Result

Round-robin stage

|}

Knockout stage

Men's Veteran Results

Pool stage

Pool 'A'

|}

Pool 'B'

|}

Knockout stage

Boys

Pools

Pool 'A'

|}

Pool 'B'

|}

Knockout stage

Boy's Cup

Boy's Plate

Boy's Bowl

Boy's Shield

Girls

Group stage

Pool 'A'

|}

Pool 'B'

|}

Knockout stage

Girl's Cup

Girl's Plate

Girl's Bowl

Girl's Shield

References

2013
2013 in African rugby union
2013 rugby sevens competitions